Iroquois Ridge High School is a secondary school located in the suburbs of Oakville, Ontario. It is often colloquially referred to as "IRHS", "Iroquois", or "The Ridge."

Layout

Iroquois Ridge High School has three stories, each of which is dedicated to a particular academic field. The first floor is dedicated to courses relating to business studies, the arts, technologies, and physical education. The second floor is devoted to modern languages, social studies, and computer sciences. The second floor is also home to the library and three computer labs. The third floor holds mathematics classrooms and science labs.

The school's main hallway is a large atrium that extends up all three stories, and has a large skylight which covers the entire ceiling. It is nicknamed "The Street" because of its planted trees, old-fashioned street lights, and the fact that the classroom windows on either side make it seem as though one is walking between two buildings.

The school has three primary staircases that go from the first floor up to the third, which are located in the center of "The Street" and at the front and back doors. There is also a staircase in "The Street" going directly to the second floor, and one in the back going from the second floor down to the football field on the east side of the building.

The school has eleven exits, which are located in the front and back entranceways, the Personal and Career Counseling (PCC) office, daycare, Communications Technology lab, the two art rooms, the art hallway entrance, cafeteria, and two exits to the field.

The school also has various concealed exits used during emergencies.

Facilities
For recreation, Iroquois Ridge High School has a large gymnasium, a soccer/football field surrounded by a 400m track with a long jump pit, and a fitness centre. Across from the school is the Iroquois Ridge Community Centre, which houses a 25m swimming pool and the public library. There are also two baseball parks behind the school that are maintained by the Town of Oakville. A field hockey/soccer field and a tennis court are located adjacent to the school and are also maintained by the Town of Oakville. The school itself also houses a library, two art rooms, two music rooms, an auto workshop, a construction workshop, a theatre, a cafeteria, and numerous computer and science labs.

Accomplishments
During the 1998-1999 school year, teachers were in a legal strike position when Iroquois Ridge students rallied together to organize a sit-in support of the hardworking teachers. This peaceful protest was held in the front hall of the school with encouraging speeches; local media covered the event.
During the 2004-2005 school year, the school was in the CTV late night news for collecting over $800 in under 20 minutes for tsunami relief help. The school's Global Issues Council runs the Halloween 4 Hunger Food Drive, which collects over 3,000 non-perishable food items for the Oakville Fairshare Food bank each year. The Council also runs World Vision's 30 Hour Famine and raises more than $10,000 each year. In October 2006, the school set a world record for the most people "standing against something" (part of the school's "Stand for Sudan" project), which was published in the 2007 edition of the Guinness World Records. In 2007, Stephen Lewis came to Iroquois Ridge to honor the students for raising $21,000 towards the Stephen Lewis foundation. During the 2009-2010 school year, with a $6.2 million infusion from the Province, Iroquois Ridge became one of the first secondary schools in Ontario with the installation of 25 large solar panels on the roof of the school. This was the class of 2010's graduating gift. In May 2011, the school raised $48,000 during its Relay For Life event for cancer.

As of 2009-2010, Iroquois Ridge High School is ranked #16 out of the 727 public secondary schools in Ontario, and #1 in the Halton District.

As of 2016-2017, Iroquois Ridge High School is ranked #25 out of 747 public secondary schools in Ontario.

As of 2019-2020. Iroquois Ridge High School is ranked #10 out of 739 public secondary schools in Ontario

Notable alumni
Kyle Bekker, Center Midfielder for Major League Soccer Toronto FC
 Daniel Clark, star of Degrassi: The Next Generation and Juno (film)
 Joshua Close, actor, filmography includes The Pacific (miniseries), The Exorcism of Emily Rose and Twist The Craigslist Killer
 Victor Oreskovich, Winger for NHL Vancouver Canucks
 Jasmine Richards, star of Camp Rock and Naturally, Sadie
 Brian Robinson, bassist in Massachusetts based punk band A Wilhelm Scream, former bassist of The Fullblast
 Jessica Shepley, LPGA member

See also
List of high schools in Ontario

References

External links
 Iroquois Ridge High School

High schools in Oakville, Ontario
1994 establishments in Ontario
Educational institutions established in 1994